Moshe Diamant  is an American film producer. He is best known for having started Trans World Entertainment (TWE) in 1983.

Filmography (Producer)
He was a producer in all films unless otherwise noted.

Film

Miscellaneous crew

As writer

Thanks

Television

References

External links

American film producers 
Living people
Year of birth missing (living people)